Shaun Kalnasy (born November 4, 1981) is a former American soccer player who spent his professional career with Spokane Shadow, Chivas USA and Atlanta Silverbacks.

References

External links
Loyola Marymount Lions bio

1981 births
Living people
American soccer players
Wake Forest Demon Deacons men's soccer players
Loyola Marymount Lions men's soccer players
Spokane Shadow players
Chivas USA players
Atlanta Silverbacks players
Association football goalkeepers
Soccer players from Washington (state)
USL League Two players
USL First Division players